Anjo Ferdinand Sarnate (born May 28, 2000), also known as Anjo, is a Filipino singer. He is known for his participation in Dream Maker, a Filipino-South Korean boy group survival reality show produced by ABS-CBN Entertainment, MLD Entertainment, and KAMP Global.

Early life and education 
Anjo Sarnate was born in Lucena City, Quezon, Philippines on May 28, 2000. Since his younger years, he was already exposed to music that he came to love singing. He stated: "I started singing for fun but then I realized that music can do more, it creates a deep emotional bond with the singer and the audience." At 9, he started to pursue his singing career, joining the choir and various amateur singing contests.

He is a Bachelor of Science in Hospitality Management student.

Career

Singing competitions 
Sarnate joined the first season of It's Showtime'''s segment "Tawag ng Tanghalan" with his rendition of "Minsan Lang Kitang Iibigin". He came back in its fifth season and became a weekly winner. In 2020, Sarnate also became a "mystery singer" on the third season of I Can See Your Voice.

In 2019, he participated the 17th Karaoke World Championships held in Kanda Myojin Shrine, Tokyo, alongside other 43 finalists. He stayed until the semifinals and won the Viewers' Choice Award with his rendition of Celine Dion's "My Heart Will Go On". He also represented the Philippines at the 25th World Championships of Performing Arts (WCOPA) in Anaheim, California, and earned 6 bronze medals.

 Dream Maker

In 2022, Sarnate participated in Dream Maker'', a reality competition show broadcast on ABS-CBN which produces a boy band from a field of 62 contestants. He stayed until the 4th ranking announcement and placed 26th.

Filmography

Television

Accolades

References

2000 births
Living people